Jessica Weidenhofer (born 7 April 1988) is a former Australian cricketer who is a right-handed batter and right-arm medium bowler. She played five List A matches for South Australia during the 2004–05 season of the Women's National Cricket League (WNCL).

References

External links
 
 

1988 births
Place of birth missing (living people)
Living people
Australian cricketers
Australian women cricketers
South Australian Scorpions cricketers